Allopodagrion brachyurum
Allopodagrion contortum
Allopodagrion erinys
Megapodagrion megalopus
Teinopodagrion angulatum
Teinopodagrion caquetanum
Teinopodagrion chinichaysuyum
Teionpodagrion croizati
Teinopodagrion curtum
Teinopodagrion decipiens
Teinopodagrion depressum
Teinopodagrion epidrium
Teionpodagrion eretes
Teinopodagrion lepidum
Teniopodagrion macropus
Teinopodagrion mercenarium
Teinopodagrion meridionale
Teinopodagrion muzanum
Teinopodagrion nebulosum
Teinopodagrion oscillans
Teinopodagrion schiessi
Teinopodagrion setigerum
Teinopodagrion temporale
Teinopodagrion turikum
Teinopodagrion vallenatum
Teinopodagrion venale
Teinopodagrion vilorianum
Teinopodagrion waynu
Teinopodagrion yunka

References